Populär Historia (Swedish: Popular History) is a Swedish language monthly history magazine published in Malmö, Sweden. The magazine has been in circulation since 1991 and is the first history oriented periodical in the country.

History and profile
Populär Historia was started in 1991. The founding company was Historiska Media. The LRF Media acquired the magazine in May 2010 and owned it until 1 June 2016 when it was sold to the Bonnier Group. 

The magazine is based in Malmö. Since 2016 the magazine has been published by the Bonnier Publications on a monthly basis. As of 2016 Jacob Wiberg was the editor-in-chief of the magazine.

In 2007 the majority of Populär Historia readers were men. The circulation of the magazine was 22,300 copies in 2000. The magazine sold 35,000 copies in 2009.

References

External links
  

1991 establishments in Sweden
Bonnier Group
History magazines
Magazines established in 1991
Mass media in Malmö
Monthly magazines published in Sweden
Swedish-language magazines